Mumtaz Ahmed Khan is a Member of Telangana Legislative Assembly elected in December 2018 from Charminar constituency. He is the honorable Speaker of Telangana Assembly. He was the five time M.L.A. from Yakutpura constituency in the State of Telangana, India. He also performs the duty of Panel Speaker in Telangana Legislative Assembly.

Khan won his sixth consecutive legislative seat from this area of the city of Hyderabad.
Mumtaz Khan was representing Yakuthpura Assembly constituency from 1994 to 2018.

He is a member of the All India Majlis-e-Ittehadul Muslimeen party, which has traditionally controlled the politics in this capital city of Telangana.

AIMIM Charminar MLA Mumtaz Ahmed Khan was sworn in on Wednesday as Telangana pro-tem speaker.

References

Living people
Telangana politicians
All India Majlis-e-Ittehadul Muslimeen politicians
Telangana MLAs 2014–2018
1949 births
Telangana MLAs 2018–2023